Abu al-Ḥakam ʿAwāna ibn al-Ḥakam ibn Awāna ibn Wazr ibn ʿAbd al-Ḥārith al-Kalbī (died 764) was an Arab historian based in Kufa and a major source for Umayyad history in the works of Hisham ibn al-Kalbi and al-Mada'ini.

Biography
Awana was the son of al-Hakam ibn Awana, the deputy Umayyad governor of Khurasan in 727 and later the governor of Sind. The family hailed from the Banu Kalb tribe of Syria, but Awana was based in Kufa in Iraq. Though there is an absence of Muslim tradition emanating from Umayyad Syria, likely lost after the region's fall to the Abbasids in 750, traces of it may be found in the accounts of Awana. He is considered an important source of information for the Umayyad period. He is frequently cited in the history of al-Tabari (d. 923) for matters pertaining to Syria, and was an historical source for the historians Hisham ibn al-Kalbi (d. 819) and al-Mada'ini (d. 843).

References

Bibliography

764 deaths
8th-century people from the Abbasid Caliphate
8th-century Arabic writers
8th-century Arabs
8th-century people from the Umayyad Caliphate
Banu Kalb
People from Kufa
Historians of Syria
8th-century historians of the medieval Islamic world